The ThinkPad X1 series is a line of high-end ThinkPad laptops and tablets produced by Lenovo.

The current model list contains six lines of machines: 
 X1 Carbon - mainstream premium 14-inch model
 X1 Yoga - the convertible 14-inch version
 X1 Titanium Yoga - a convertible 13.5-inch version with titanium body
 X1 Extreme - 15-inch advanced ultra-light premium laptop; the same model with a Quadro GPU known as ThinkPad P1
 X1 Nano - a 13-inch version - lightest thinkpad model
 X1 Fold - the first foldable personal computer

Launch

The first laptop with X1 branding was the ThinkPad X1  - the 13-inch sub-compact model, the thinnest and fastest charging business laptop at the time. Instead of previous 13-inch X Series models (X300 and X301), they have only one RAM slot and only one storage slot.

In early August 2012, Lenovo released the ThinkPad X1 Carbon as the 14-inch successor to the earlier ThinkPad X1. The X1 Carbon was first released in China due to the popularity of ThinkPads in that market. In November 2012, Lenovo announced a touch-screen variant called the ThinkPad X1 Carbon Touch designed for use with Windows 8. Its display makes use of multi-touch technology that can detect simultaneous inputs from up to ten fingers. On the performance of the X1 Carbon Touch's SSD, Engadget states, "The machine boots into the [s]tart screen in 11 seconds, which is pretty typical for a Windows 8 machine with specs like these. We also found that the solid-state drive delivers equally strong read and write speeds (551 MB/s and 518 MB/s, respectively), which we noticed the last time we tested an Ultrabook with an Intel SSD."

Models

2011 - 0th generation

X1
An addition to the lightweight X series, weighing between 1.36 kg to 1.72 kg depending on configuration. It was the thinnest ThinkPad laptop to date at 16.5 (front) and 21.5 mm (rear). Base configuration uses an Intel Sandy Bridge 2.5 GHz Core i5-2520M (up to 3.20 GHz) with 4 GiB of RAM (up to 8 GiB), SATA SSD or hard drive, Intel Integrated HD Graphics, USB 3.0, backlit keyboard, 802.11 b/g/n WiFi and an average of eight hours of battery life. The battery is internal and not removable, and there is no optical drive.

The ThinkPad X1 laptop was released by Lenovo in May 2011. Notebook Review offered a positive opinion of the ThinkPad X1, saying that it was, "A powerful notebook that combines the durability and features of a business-class ThinkPad with the style of a consumer laptop." A 13.3-inch X1 ThinkPad was announced to be available in the UK on June 7, 2011.

The specifications of the ThinkPad X1 laptop are given below:
 Processor: Up to Intel Core i7-2620M (2× 2.70GHz, 4MB L3)
 Memory: Up to 8GiB DDR3 1333MT/s (1 slot)
 Graphics: Intel HD Graphics 3000
 Storage: 1 × SATA 6Gbit/s (320GB 7200RPM HDD, or an SSD, ranging from 128GiB to 160GiB)
 Battery: Up to 5.2 hours. This could be extended further to 10 hours with a slice battery.

2012 - 1st generation

X1 Carbon

The X1 Carbon features a solid-state drive (SSD) instead of a hard drive. The base model has 4GiB of memory, an Intel Core i5-3317U processor, and a 128GiB SSD. The most expensive model has an Intel Core i7 processor and a 256GiB SSD. The X1 Carbon requires the use of a dongle to access wired ethernet and some models include 3G or 4G cellular modems.

The base model X1 Carbon has a  TN screen with a resolution of 1600 by 900 pixels. The X1 Carbon's roll cage is made of light-weight carbon-fiber and has a matte black finish.

In November 2012, Lenovo announced a touch-screen variant called the ThinkPad X1 Carbon Touch designed for use with Windows 8. Its display makes use of multi-touch technology that can detect simultaneous inputs from up to ten fingers.

In a review published for CNET, Dan Ackerman wrote, "At first glance, the ThinkPad X1 Carbon looks a lot like other ThinkPads, but in the hand it stands out as very light and portable. The excellent keyboard shows up other ultrabooks, and the rugged build quality is reassuring. With a slightly boosted battery and maybe a lower starting price, this could be a serious contender for my all-around favorite thin laptop."

In another review for CNET, Nicholas Aaron Khoo wrote, "For this geek, there are many things to like about this 14-inch (1600x900 HD+) Ultrabook when it comes to usability when traveling on economy class. These include the backlit and spill-resistant keyboard, side-positioned ports, nice viewing angles, TrackPoint (which not everyone likes), nicely implemented touchpad and biometric login. Unlike  poorer cousin, the Lenovo IdeaPad U410, it is able to go into hibernate mode without having the user jump through hoops to enable it."

On the X1 Carbon Touch's SSD performance Engadget states, "The machine boots into the [s]tart screen in 11 seconds, which is pretty typical for a Windows 8 machine with specs like these. We also found that the solid-state drive delivers equally strong read and write speeds (551 MB/s and 518 MB/s, respectively), which we noticed the last time we tested an Ultrabook with an Intel SSD."

2012 Touch
In a review for Engadget, Dana Wollman wrote, "Starting with ergonomics, this has one of the best keyboard / touchpad combinations we've seen on a laptop, and that's not even counting that signature red pointing stick. We're also enamored with the design: aside from being well-made, the X1 Carbon Touch is also notably thin and light [at 1.55kg] for a 14-inch machine, especially one with a touchscreen. The display is hardly our favorite, what with the narrow viewing angles, but at least the 1,600 x 900 resolution is nice and crisp."

In its review of the X1 Carbon Touch, Wired wrote, "Lenovo also hasn't forgotten about the things that users actually care about. Audio is impressive and Dolby-certified. The keyboard is backlit and fully usable, and the glass touchpad was rock solid on this go-round with the Carbon." In its final verdict Wired stated that an "Excellent combination of performance, portability, and durability" and "the best keyboard going" make the Touch 'Wired."

2014 – 2nd generation

X1 Carbon (2nd Gen)

The 2014 X1 Carbon features a 4th generation Intel processor and an "Adaptive Keyboard" touch bar where the function keys are normally located. The Home and End keys replaced the Caps Lock key, requiring the user to double-press the Shift key to activate Caps Lock. The Delete key was also repositioned to the right of the Backspace key instead of above it.

Peter Bright wrote a disparaging review for Ars Technica. He found the X1 Carbon with the Lenovo named "Adaptive Keyboard" to be near perfect but unusable because the keyboard was so non-standard when compared with that of a desktop, the older Thinkpad T410s and Lenovo Helix keyboards. As a touch typist, he despairs at the removal of the function keys, and the repositioning of Caps Lock, replacing it with Home End, and, that pretty much each little-finger key has moved.

2015 – 3rd generation

X1 Carbon (3rd Gen)
The 2015 X1 Carbon came with a 2560 by 1440 screen. Lenovo reverted to the traditional Function row from the innovative but confusing Adaptive Function Row, and resumed using dedicated mouse buttons under the TrackPoint in the 2015 model. A fingerprint reader is to the right of the keyboard and can be used to log into Windows.

In a review for Laptop Magazine, Mark Spoonauer wrote, "The ThinkPad X1 Carbon is easily one of the best business ultraportables available. While on the pricey side, the $1,754 configuration I reviewed delivers everything I want in a laptop: long battery life, a comfortable typing experience and strong overall performance. The X1 Carbon's design doesn't wow, but it's light and feels like it can stand up to abuse. However, the lack of an SD card slot is annoying, and I wish the 14-inch display were as bright as it is sharp

2016 – 4th generation

X1 Carbon (4th Gen)
In January 2016 at the Consumer Electronics Show (CES), Lenovo presented their fourth generation X1 Carbon.

X1 Yoga

The first generation of the X1 Yoga was released in 2016, featuring a  touchscreen with a 360-degree hinge. Unlike many other laptops in the X1 series, it features a stylus and a dedicated slot for it. Like many others in the X1 series, the X1 Yoga features a built-in fingerprint sensor, multiple USB ports, an HDMI port, and support for up to Intel i7 processors.

X1 Tablet
The ThinkPad X1 tablet is a modular device that uses what Lenovo calls an "Ultra Connect" system to tie together removable modules such as an extra battery pack, a pico projector, a 3D camera, a detachable keyboard, etc. The X1 tablet is powered by an Intel Core m7 processor paired with up to 16GiB of memory and solid state drives up to 1TiB in capacity.

2017 – 5th generation

X1 Carbon (5th Gen) 
In January 2017 at the Consumer Electronics Show (CES), Lenovo presented their fifth generation X1 Carbon, 1.14 kg weight, which delivers up to 15.5 hours of battery life starting at $1,329. A silver version was also introduced.

Recall 
The ThinkPad X1 Carbon 5th Generation laptops built before 2017-11-01 were recalled after reports that a screw left in the laptop during manufacturing could damage one of the lithium batteries causing one of the cells to short out, leading to rapid overheating and failure. 83,500 of the laptops had been sold in the US and Canada before the recall.

X1 Yoga (2nd Gen) 
Changes from previous X1 Yoga includes the use of 7th generation Intel Core i ('Kaby Lake') processors, addition of Thunderbolt 3 ports, USB-C connector for power adapter, 'wave' style keyboard featuring matte finish on the keyboard.

X1 Tablet (2nd Gen)

2018 – 6th generation

X1 Carbon (6th Gen) 
In January 2018 at the Consumer Electronics Show (CES), Lenovo presented their sixth generation X1 Carbon, weighing 1.13 kg. This is the first X1 Carbon model to have a quad-core processor. It features an 8th generation Intel Core i5 or i7 processor, along with up to 16 GiB of RAM and up to 1 TiB of storage. X1 branding is also now present on the cover. The ThinkPad logo has changed to black instead of the previous silver branding.

X1 Yoga (3rd Gen) 
The design is derived from 6th generation ThinkPad X1 Carbon, with the ThinkShutter privacy camera included by default (except for models with an IR camera), 15W 8th generation Core i5/i7 quad core processors and a built-in stylus. OLED screens are no longer an option.

X1 Tablet (3rd Gen)

X1 Extreme (1st Gen)
The first 15.6-inch ThinkPad X-series laptop. Also, in contrast to the regular 14-inch Thinkpad X series models, the X1 Extreme has user-upgradable RAM and the full-power HQ-series mobile Intel CPUs.

X1 Extreme laptop have a sibling model in a ThinkPad P series line, known as a ThinkPad P1.

2019 – 7th generation

X1 Carbon (7th Gen) 

In January 2019 at the Consumer Electronics Show (CES), Lenovo announced their seventh generation X1 Carbon, weighing . It comes with the latest Intel i5 or i7 processors, optional 4K display featuring Dolby Vision HDR, and a thinner chassis than the last generation. It also supports a new optional carbon fiber weave top cover.

X1 Yoga (4th Gen) 
The design is derived from 7th generation ThinkPad X1 Carbon. This is notably the first ThinkPad with aluminum chassis. 15W 8th/10th generation Core i5/i7 quad core processors and a built-in stylus.

X1 Extreme (2nd Gen)
The updated version of first generation; the first non-Yoga ThinkPad laptop with an OLED screen option.

The sibling model is a Thinkpad P1 gen2.

2020 – 8th generation

X1 Carbon (8th Gen) 
In January 2020 at the Consumer Electronics Show (CES), Lenovo announced their eighth generation X1 Carbon. It comes with Intel Comet Lake processors, optional PrivacyGuard display, and WiFi 6 support. The Fedora Linux distribution is also offered pre-installed on the laptop.

X1 Yoga (5th Gen) 
The design is derived from 8th generation ThinkPad X1 Carbon. 10th generation Core i5/i7 quad core processors and a built-in stylus.

X1 Nano 
Lenovo unveiled the first X1 Nano in September 2020. X1 Nano is the lightest ThinkPad ever at just 1.99 pounds (907g) and also Lenovo's first ThinkPad based on Intel Evo platform, powered by 11th Gen Intel Core processors. The machine has a 13-inch 16:10 screen with 4 speakers with Dolby Atmos and 4 360-degree microphones.

2021 - 9th generation

X1 Titanium Yoga (1st Gen) 
In 2021, Lenovo released the X1 Titanium Yoga, a 13.5-inch laptop with an 11th Gen Intel Core i5 or i7 processor and integrated Intel Iris Xe graphics.

X1 Carbon (9th Gen) 
In January 2021 at the Consumer Electronics Show (CES), Lenovo announced their ninth generation X1 Carbon. It comes with a 16:10 aspect ratio display, wider touchpad, and a larger battery.

X1 Yoga (6th Gen)

X1 Extreme (3rd Gen) 
The update of 15" line; the last X1 ThinkPad line with non-reduced 1.8mm key travel.

2022

X1 Carbon (10th Gen) 

A tenth generation was announced by Lenovo in January 2022.

X1 Extreme 

A 4th generation became available in 2022, and Lenovo announced an upcoming 5th generation.

X1 Fold

Lenovo introduces the new ThinkPad X1 Fold 2022 laptop, and it begins shipping in November.

2023

X1 Carbon (11th Gen) 

An eleventh generation was announced by Lenovo in December 2022.  It will use recycled materials for the first time: up to 97 percent post-consumer plastic in some components, 90 percent recycled magnesium, and 55 percent recycled aluminum.  This generation will use Intel's 13th generation of mobile processors.

This announcement also included new versions of the X1 Yoga (13 inch) and X1 Nano (13 inch).

See also
Thinkpad X1 Tablet
 What is Intel Evo Platform

References

Lenovo laptops
Ultrabooks
X1 Carbon
Computer-related introductions in 2011